Chloropterus stigmaticollis is a species of leaf beetle of Tunisia, described by Léon Fairmaire in 1875.

References

Eumolpinae
Beetles of North Africa
Taxa named by Léon Fairmaire
Beetles described in 1875